Michael Tukura (born 19 october 1988 in Abuja) is a Nigerian footballer, who currently plays for the Israeli Premier League club Hapoel Petah Tikva.

Career 
Tukura began his career with dynamite f.c in Nigeria. In 2007, he signed with Wikki Tourists F.C., and in summer 2008 he joined the Israeli club Hakoah Amidar Ramat Gan on a ten months loan deal. He played his first game in the Israeli Premier League on 13 September 2008 against Bnei Yehuda. At the end of the season Hakoah Amidar Ramat Gan finished last in the league table and were relegated back to Liga Leumit after the play-off matches against Maccabi Ahi Nazareth. In fact, in 2009 he moved to the new promoted Maccabi Ahi Nazareth, where he spent a year, playing 23 matches and scoring 1 goal. In April 2010 Tukura joined FK Ventspils, playing in the Latvian Virsliga. He made his debut on 1, 2010 in a league match against SK Blāzma. He scored his first goal in a league match against FK Jūrmala-VV on 2 June 2010. All in all he played 14 matches that season, scoring 1 goal. On July 11, 2014, Tukura signed with Hapoel Petah Tikva, which was promoted from the Liga Leumit to the Israeli Premier League.

Position 
Tukura plays as a central midfielder in attacking midfield or defensive midfield and also as center back.

Honours 

 Triobet Baltic League (1): 2010
 Latvian Cup (1): 2011

References

External links 
 

1988 births
Living people
Nigerian footballers
Nigerian expatriate sportspeople in Latvia
Nigerian expatriate footballers
Expatriate footballers in Israel
Wikki Tourists F.C. players
Nigerian expatriate sportspeople in Israel
Maccabi Ahi Nazareth F.C. players
FK Ventspils players
Expatriate footballers in Latvia
FC Rubin Kazan players
Expatriate footballers in Russia
FC Vaslui players
Hakoah Maccabi Amidar Ramat Gan F.C. players
Hapoel Petah Tikva F.C. players
Hapoel Ramat Gan F.C. players
Expatriate footballers in Romania
Israeli Premier League players
Liga Leumit players
Association football midfielders
People from Abuja